Alejandro 'Álex' Zambrano Martín (born 4 August 1991) is a Spanish footballer who plays for Antequera CF as a midfielder.

Club career
Born in Huelva, Andalusia, Zambrano graduated from Recreativo de Huelva's youth setup. He made his senior debut with the reserves in the 2009–10 season, in Tercera División.

Zambrano was promoted to the first team for the 2011–12 campaign, with the Andalusians in the Segunda División. He made his league debut on 27 August, starting and being booked in a 1–0 away loss against Deportivo de La Coruña.

On 25 August 2012, Zambrano terminated his contract with Recre and signed for Villarreal CF B in the same league. On 17 July of the following year he moved to another reserve team, Sporting de Gijón B from Segunda División B.

On 18 August 2014, Zambrano joined CD San Roque de Lepe also in the third tier. On 16 July of the following year, he returned to his first club Recreativo after agreeing to a two-year deal.

Zambrano left the Estadio Nuevo Colombino in the summer of 2018, signing with division three team CD Don Benito.

Personal life
Zambrano's father and uncle, respectively Manuel and Antonio, were also footballers. They too represented Recreativo professionally; during his spell there, the former also acted as the club's president.

References

External links

1991 births
Living people
Spanish footballers
Footballers from Huelva
Association football midfielders
Segunda División players
Segunda División B players
Tercera División players
Primera Federación players
Segunda Federación players
Atlético Onubense players
Recreativo de Huelva players
Villarreal CF B players
Sporting de Gijón B players
CD San Roque de Lepe footballers
CD Don Benito players
Yeclano Deportivo players
Internacional de Madrid players
Antequera CF footballers
Afturelding men's football players
Spanish expatriate footballers
Expatriate footballers in Iceland
Spanish expatriate sportspeople in Iceland